Khin Zaw Oo (born 27 June  1966) is a Burmese politician who currently serves as an Amyotha Hluttaw MP for Mon State No. 3 constituency. He is a member of the National League for Democracy.

Early life and education
Khin Zaw Oo was born on 27 June 1966 in Kyaikmaraw, Mon State, Myanmar. He graduated with a B.Sc. from Mawlamyaing University.

Political career
He is a member of the National League for Democracy Party, and was elected as an Amyotha Hluttaw MP, winning a majority of 21942 votes and elected representative from Mon State No. 3 parliamentary constituency.

References

National League for Democracy politicians
1966 births
Living people
People from Mon State